Vijayendra Ghatge is an Indian actor in Bollywood film and television. He is known for his role of Lala Vrishbhaan in the TV serial Buniyaad that originally aired on DD National in 1986. Among other serials and several films, he is also known for his roles in Chitchor (1976), Prem Rog (1982) and more recently Devdas (2002) and Jhankaar Beats (2003).
Born 1950

Background and education
Ghatge is a member of the Maratha royal family of Kagal, which was a feudatory vassal of Kolhapur State. He is thus a relative of the Maharaja of Kolhapur, as Chhatrapati Shahu was adopted from Kagal and placed on the Gadi of Kolhapur. Ghatge's mother, Sitaraje Ghatge, is the daughter of the Maharaja Tukoji Rao Holkar III of Indore (reigned 1903–1926) by his American-born third wife Nancy Miller (who was formally adopted by the Maharaja's aunt and took the name Sharmishtha Devi Holkar upon marrying the Maharaja). He  is the uncle of Indian actress Sagarika Ghatge (sometimes mistakenly considered as her father).
He is married to Avantika Ghatge who was formerly working as head of department of Fine Arts at the Daly College in Indore and together they have a daughter Umikaa Ghatge, who studied at the Daly College and is a freelance content writer.

After doing B.Com Honours (Management) from Sydenham College of Commerce, Bombay Vijayendra graduated in acting course from the FTII, Pune.

Career
Ghatge started his film career with a supporting role in Rajshri Productions' 1976 Hindi film Chitchor. Directed by Basu Chatterjee, the film was a box office "Superhit". Thereafter, he did various  supporting roles in films like Kasme Vaade (1978), Tere Pyar Mein, Prem Rog (1982) and Razia Sultan (1983). In the mid-1980s, Ghatge began appearing in television serials. His character role of Lala Vrishbhaan, played in the 1986–87 classic serial Buniyaad made him a household name.

In 2002, Ghatge appeared in the Sanjay Leela Bhansali directed Devdas in the role of Bhuvan Choudhary, the aging husband of the heroine, Paro, played by Aishwarya Rai.

Filmography

Films

Television

References

External links

Film and Television Institute of India alumni
Indian male television actors
Indian male film actors
Living people
Marathi people
Year of birth missing (living people)
The Daly College Alumni
People from Indore
People from Madhya Pradesh